Paudie O'Mahony (born 1952) is an Irish former Gaelic footballer. His league and championship career at senior level for the Kerry county team spanned nine seasons from 1973 to 1982.

Playing career
O'Mahony made his debut on the inter-county scene at the age of seventeen when he was selected for the Kerry minor team in 1970. He spent one championship season with the minor team; however, he was an All-Ireland MFC runner-up. O'Mahony subsequently joined the Kerry under-21 team, winning an All-Ireland medal in 1973. Later that year he joined the Kerry senior team, making his debut during the 1973–74 league. Over the course of the next nine seasons, O'Mahony won five All-Ireland SFC medals, beginning with a lone triumph on the field of play in 1975, followed by a record-equalling four championships in-a-row as a non-playing substitute from 1978 to 1981. He also won eight Munster SFC medals and one National Football League medal. He retired from inter-county football following Kerry's failure to secure a fifth successive All-Ireland SFC title in 1982.

Personal life
O'Mahony participated in the 2014 series of Operation Transformation.

Honours
Kerry
All-Ireland Senior Football Championship (5): 1975, 1978, 1979, 1980, 1981
Munster Senior Football Championship (8): 1975, 1976, 1977, 1978, 1979, 1980, 1981, 1982
 National Football League (1): 1973-74
All-Ireland Under-21 Football Championship (1): 1973
Munster Under-21 Football Championship (1): 1973
Munster Minor Football Championship (1): 1970

Munster
Railway Cup (2): 1976, 1978

References

1952 births
Living people
All Stars Awards winners (football)
Gaelic football goalkeepers
Irish engineers
Kerry inter-county Gaelic footballers
Munster inter-provincial Gaelic footballers
Participants in Irish reality television series
Spa Gaelic footballers